The Civil War Museum of Philadelphia (formerly the Civil War and Underground Railroad Museum of Philadelphia and previously the Civil War Library and Museum) in Philadelphia, Pennsylvania, claims to be the oldest chartered American Civil War institution in the United States. The museum was founded in 1888 by veteran officers of the Union Army, Navy and Marine Corps.

In 2008, the museum closed to the public in anticipation of a move to other quarters. In June 2016 the museum announced that ownership of its collection of about 3,000 artifacts will be transferred to the Gettysburg Foundation, "the non-profit partner of the National Park Service at Gettysburg." Artifacts from the collection will continue to be displayed in Philadelphia at the National Constitution Center.  Books, archives and other two-dimensional material will continue to be owned by the Civil War Museum and are available to researchers at the Heritage Center of the Union League of Philadelphia.

While closed, the collection were stored at the Gettysburg Museum and Visitor Center, where material from the collection was displayed 2013–2015.

Location
On August 7, 2007, the museum announced that it would relocate from 1805 Pine Street near Rittenhouse Square to the former First Bank of the United States building, near Independence Hall. Philadelphia Mayor John F. Street presented the museum with a check for $1.2 million to assist in its relocation. On August 2, 2008, the Pine Street location permanently closed and the museum planned to reopen in its new location in 2011.

In 2009, Governor Ed Rendell canceled the state's portion of the funding needed to relocate the museum, prompting the National Park Service to withdraw its offer to use the First Bank building.

Collection
The museum displayed the mounted head of "Old Baldy", the horse that was ridden by Union Major General George G. Meade during most of the Civil War. Old Baldy's head was mounted in 1882 and restored in 1991. In 2010, it was returned to its owner, the Grand Army of the Republic Museum and Library in the Frankford neighborhood of Philadelphia, which had loaned it to the Civil War Museum over 30 years before. 

In addition to a large portrait and artifacts associated with General Meade, the museum's had personal items from other Union generals including Ulysses S. Grant, John F. Reynolds, and George B. McClellan.

The collection also included a large number of military escutcheons, which were made in the United States from the end of the Civil War until about 1907. They resemble a coat of arms and depict the military record of a veteran. Usually commissioned by the veteran or his family to memorialize his service, they were produced by an artist using chromolithography.

The museum had items pertaining to Abraham Lincoln, including a cast of his hands, a lock of hair, and a death mask.

References

External links
 Official website

African-American museums in Pennsylvania
American Civil War museums in Pennsylvania
History museums in Pennsylvania
Museums established in 1888
Museums in Philadelphia
Pennsylvania in the American Civil War
Underground Railroad in Pennsylvania